A rumāl (Punjabi: ਰੁਮਾਲ) is a piece of clothing similar to a handkerchief or bandana. It is worn by  men who cut their hair and other guests when they are in a Gurdwara. Covering the head is respectful in Sikhism and if a man is not wearing a turban, then a rumāl must be worn before entering the Gurdwara. Rumāls are also worn by Sikh children on their topknot, and by Sikh males while engaging in athletic activities.

In most Gurdwaras, there is often a basket of rumāls outside for welcoming in more guests. If there are no rumāls supplied by the Gurdwara then a clean and plain handkerchief is the most suitable cloth to use.

Outside the context of Sikhism, a rumāl is simply the Urdu, Hindi, Nepali and Bengali word for handkerchief, and will be understood as such. Its association with Sikhism is not implied.

The rumāl was used by the Thugees in India as a method of strangulation. A coin was knotted in one end of the scarf, and would be swung around the neck of the victim, who would then be strangled. 

In the 1970s television series Dad's Army, Corporal Jones attempts to strangle Captain Ramsey with such a rumāl in the episode "We Know Our Onions".

References

Sikh religious clothing
Punjabi words and phrases
Indian clothing